This list is of the Historic Sites of Japan located within the Prefecture of Fukui.

National Historic Sites
As of 1 September 2019, twenty-five Sites have been designated as being of national significance (including one *Special Historic Site); Genbao Castle Site spans the prefectural borders with Shiga.

|-
|}

Prefectural Historic Sites
As of 1 May 2019, twenty-nine Sites have been designated as being of prefectural importance.

Municipal Historic Sites
As of 1 May 2019, a further two hundred and seven Sites have been designated as being of municipal importance.

See also

 Cultural Properties of Japan
 Wakasa Province
 Echizen Province
 Fukui Prefectural Museum of Cultural History
 List of Places of Scenic Beauty of Japan (Fukui)
 List of Cultural Properties of Japan - historical materials (Fukui)
 List of Cultural Properties of Japan - paintings (Fukui)

References

External links
  Cultural Properties of Fukui Prefecture
  Historic Sites in Fukui Prefecture

Fukui Prefecture
 Fukui